John Peter Robinson (born 16 September 1945) is an English composer, musician, and arranger known for his film and television scores.

Early years and pop music career 
He studied piano and composition at the Royal Academy of Music and enjoyed a successful career as a session keyboardist throughout the 1970s, working with artists such as Brand X, Phil Collins, Mike Rutherford, Shawn Phillips, Quatermass, Sun Treader/Morris Pert, Carly Simon, Bryan Ferry, Stealers Wheel, Andrew Lloyd Webber, The Hollies and others. As a successful pop arranger, he has also collaborated in later years with Eric Clapton, Manhattan Transfer, Al Jarreau and Melissa Etheridge, among others.

Film music career 
He made his film music debut as a solo composer in 1985, scoring a number of successful films including The Believers (1987), The Kiss (1988), Cocktail (1988), Blind Fury (1989), Wayne's World (1992), Wes Craven's New Nightmare (1994), Highlander III: The Sorcerer (1994), Vampire in Brooklyn (1995, also directed by Wes Craven), Firestorm (1998), The World's Fastest Indian (2005) and The Bank Job (2008). He also composed for numerous television films and series including The Wonder Years, Eerie, Indiana, Tales from the Crypt, Todd McFarlane's Spawn, The Outer Limits, and Charmed.

In addition he scored the horror films The Wraith (1986) and The Gate (1987) with Michael Hoenig, and scored the English-language version of Godzilla 2000. He also composed music for the 1989 movie The Wizard, as well as two songs from the film Shelter (2007), and music in dozens of episodes of the TV series Charmed.

Discography

Quatermass 
Singles:
 1970: "Black sheep of the family/Good Lord Knows"
 1971: "Gemini/Black sheep of the family"
 1971: "One Blind Mice/Punting"

Album:
 1970: Quatermass

Jesus Christ Superstar 
 1970: Jesus Christ Superstar - With Ian Gillan, Murray Head, Yvonne Elliman and Mike D'Abo

Shawn Phillips 
 1970: Contribution
 1970: Second Contribution
 1971: Collaboration: Piano, organ, bass on "Moonshine" and orchestral arrangements on "The Only Logical Conclusion"
 1973: Bright White: Keyboards and orchestral arrangements on "All The Kings and Castles"
 1974: Furthermore
 1974: Do you wonder
 1976: Rumplestiltskin's Resolve
 1977: Spaced
 1978: Transcendance: Piano on "Implication"

Carly Simon 
 1972: No Secrets: Piano on "Embrace Me, You Child"

Yvonne Elliman 
 1972: Yvonne Elliman
 1973: Food of Love

Sun Treader 
 1973: Zin Zin
 2001: The Voyage

Stomu Yamashta's Red Buddha Theater 
 1973: The Man From The East - Original Score - Robinson on Fender Rhodes on 4 songs
 2007: Two Originals - The Man From The East & Red Buddha Theater - Compilation

 Bryan Ferry 
 1974: Another Time, Another Place Ablution 
 1974: Ablution - With John Gustafson, Barry De Souza, Jayson Lindh, Jan Schaffer, Malando Gassama, Ola Brunkert

 Lenny White 
 1975: Venusian Summer David Bowie 
 1977: Low - Piano and ARP Synth on "Subterraneans"

 Stomu Yamashta's Go 
 1977 : Go Too - Keyboards

 Brand X 
 1978: Masques 1979: Product - With Phil Collins
 1980: Do They Hurt? - With Phil Collins

 Phil Collins 
 1981: Face Value: Prophet V on "Behind the lines"
 1982: Hello, I Must Be Going!: Piano, vibes on "You can't hurry love"
 1998: …Hits - Compilation: On "You can't hurry love"
 2004: The Platinum Collection - Compilation: On "Behind the lines"
 2016: The singles - Compilation: Robinson on "Behind the lines" and "You can't hurry love"

 Anni-Frid Lyngstad (Frida) 
 1982: Something's Going On - Robinson on keyboards, string and horn arrangements. With Phil Collins, Daryl Stuermer, Mo Foster, The Phenix Horns from Earth, Wind & Fire and The Martyn Ford Orchestra. Album produced by Phil Collins

 Mike Rutherford 
 1982: Acting Very Strange Eric Clapton 
 1985: Behind the Sun - Robinson also collaborated on the writing of "She's Waiting" with Clapton, as well as playing synthesizer on seven songs
 1999: Clapton Chronicles: The Best of Eric Clapton - Compilation

 Joan Armatrading 
 1995: What's Inside - with Tony Levin, Boz Burrell, Manu Katché, The London Metropolitan Orchestra, etc.

 Partial filmography 

 Film 

 Police Story (1985) - 1998 New Line Cinema home video version
 The Wraith (1986) - with Michael Hoenig
 The Gate (1987) - with Michael Hoenig
 Return of the Living Dead Part II (1987)
 The Believers (1987)
 Police Story 2 (1988) - 1998 New Line Cinema home video version
 The Blob (1988) - with Michael Hoenig
 Cocktail (1988)
 The Kiss (1988)
 Blind Fury (1989)
 The Wizard (1989)
 Cadillac Man (1990)
 Wayne's World (1992)
 Encino Man (1992)
 Wes Craven's New Nightmare (1994) - Themes by Charles Bernstein
 Highlander III: The Sorcerer (1994) - Also conductor, themes by Michael Kamen 
 Rumble in the Bronx (1995) - with Nathan Wong
 Mind Ripper (1995)
 Vampire in Brooklyn (1995)
 Police Story 4: First Strike (1996) - English-language version
 Mr. Nice Guy (1997)
 Firestorm (1998)
 Godzilla 2000 (1999) - with Takayuki Hattori
 Detroit Rock City (1999)
 15 Minutes (2001)
 Wishcraft (2002)
 Beeper (2002)
 The World's Fastest Indian (2005)
 Quinceañera (2006)
 Shelter (2007)
 The Bank Job (2008)
 Blue Crush 2 (2011)
 Seeking Justice (2011)
 Heaven's Floor (2016)
 Mad Families (2017)

 Television 

 Television films 

 Kate's Secret (1986)
 J. Edgar Hoover (1987)
 Bates Motel (1987)
 When You Remember Me (1990)
 Prison Stories: Women on the Inside (1991)
 Deadly Intentions... Again? (1991)
 Hell Hath No Fury (1991)
 Generation X (1996)
 Buried Secrets (1996)
 Gargantua (1998)
 Brink! (1998)
 Don't Look Down (1998)
 The Linda McCartney Story (2000)
 Black River (2001)
 12 Days of Terror (2004)

 Television series 

 Rags to Riches (1987): 3 episodes
 Nightmare Classics (1989): 1 episode
 The Wonder Years (1990–1991): 16 episodes
 Tales from the Crypt (1990–1996): 6 episodes
 Eerie, Indiana (1991–92): 5 episodes
 Nightmare Cafe (1992): 6 episodes
 The Outer Limits (1995–99): 7 episodes
 Kindred: The Embraced (1996): 6 episodes
 Perversions of Science (1997): 2 episodes
 Charmed (1999–2006): 72 episodes
 Spawn: The Animated Series (1999): 6 episodes
 The Handler (2003–2004): 8 episodes
 Covert One: The Hades Factor (2006): Miniseries; 2 episodes
 Deadliest Catch (2009-10): 17 episodes
 Airplane Repo (2013): 6 episodes
 Cleaners (2013–2014): 18 episodes

 Awards and nominations 
 1988 Saturn Award for Best Music: Return of the Living Dead Part II (nominated)
 1994 Saturn Award for Best Music: Wes Craven's New Nightmare (nominated)
 2006 New Zealand Screen Award for Best Achievement in Original Music: The World's Fastest Indian'' (nominated)

References

External links 
 
 

1945 births
Alumni of the Royal College of Music
Brand X members
English film score composers
English male film score composers
English keyboardists
Living people
People from South Bucks District
Quatermass (band) members